Baritius cyclozonata is a moth of the family Erebidae. It was described by George Hampson in 1901. It is found in French Guiana, Suriname, Brazil, the Amazon region, Ecuador, Peru and Bolivia.

References

Phaegopterina
Moths described in 1901